This is a list of presidents of Queen's College, Cambridge. While the head of most colleges are called masters, the head of Queens' College, Cambridge, has been called the president since 1448. Below is the list of presidents that have served the college:

Queens' College, Cambridge
Queen's
 List